Hall of the Supreme Principle is one of the Six Western Palaces of the Forbidden City, which used to be the residences of imperial concubines. The palace is west of the Palace of Eternal Longevity, north of the Palace of Eternal Spring, and south of the Hall of Mental Cultivation. They are all found in Beijing, China.

History 
The palace was built in 1420 and named "Palace of Endless Good Omens" by the Jiajing Emperor in 1535. The palace was renamed as "Hall of Supreme Principle" in 1741. In 1860, Taiji hall was connected with Changchun Palace by converting its rear, Tiyuan hall, into an Opera stage with veranda, where Empress Dowager Cixi could watch Peking opera performances. 

The Hall of the Supreme principle has five rooms, two side halls, and a rear hall. The Qixiang gate is equipped with a wooden screen, believed to protect the house from mischievous spirits. The main hall has a gabled roof covered with yellow glazed tiles like most palaces in Forbidden City. The beams are decorated with Suzhou style paintings, golden dragons, and phoenixes. The walls are intricately decorated with medallions of phoenixes sitting on the mountain, untypically for other palaces.

Residents

Ming Dynasty

Qing Dynasty

Gallery

References

Buildings and structures in Dongcheng District, Beijing
Forbidden City